Robin Venu Uthappa (born 11 November 1985) is a former Indian cricketer, who last played for Kerala in domestic cricket & Chennai Super Kings in IPL. Robin has represented team India in ODIs and T20Is.

Uthappa made his One Day International debut in the seventh and final match of the English tour of India in April 2006. He had a successful debut, making 86 as an opening batsman before being dismissed run out. It was the highest score for an Indian debutant in a limited-overs match. He is nicknamed 'The Walking Assassin' for his tactic of charging down towards the bowler. He played an important role in India's win at the 2007 ICC World Twenty20. He finished the 2014–15 Ranji Trophy season as the highest run scorer that season and was also the highest run-scorer that year in the IPL. He announced his retirement from all forms of cricket on 14 September 2022.

Early life
Uthappa was born in Kodagu in Karnataka, India. He received his education at Sri Bhagawan Mahaveer Jain College which comes under the umbrella of Jain University, Bangalore.

Career 

Uthappa first came to the public's attention when he made 66 for India B against India A in the Challenger Trophy in 2005. The following year, in the same tournament, Uthappa made match-winning 93-ball 100 against the same team which propelled him in the big league. Previously, he had been a member of the India Under-19 team that won the Asia Cup. Once a wicket-keeper batsman, his List A batting average of near 40 with a strike rate of approximately 90 has made him regarded as something of a limited overs cricket specialist.

He was recalled to the ODI side in January 2007 for the series against the West Indies. He did not feature in the first two games. He scored a quick 70 in the third game followed by a quickfire 28 in the fourth game.

He was selected in the 15-member squad of the Indian team for the 2007 Cricket World Cup held in the West Indies in March–April 2007. He played in all three group games, but only scored 30 runs in total as India suffered a shock defeat to Bangladesh and a loss to Sri Lanka resulting in the team not qualifying for the Super 8 stage.

In the sixth ODI of the NatWest Series 2007–2008, he scored 47 off 33 balls to take India to a thrilling victory, keeping Indian hopes alive in the 7- match series which they were trailing 2–3 before the match. Used to batting as an opener, in this match he came in at the unfamiliar position of no 7. When he came at the crease India were 5 down for 234 after 40.2 overs, still needing 83 from less than 10 overs. After Dhoni got out in the 47th over with the Indian score at 294, Uthappa kept a cool head to take India to the target with two balls to spare in a remarkable victory.

Uthappa also scored a crucial 50 against Pakistan in the 20–20 World Cup in South Africa in the year 2007, when India were tottering at 39/4. With this, he became the first Indian to score a 50 in a T20 International match. India subsequently won the match in bowl out 3–0, where he bowled one of the three deliveries that hit the stumps.

After his impressive performance in the seventh season of IPL, he was selected to captain the India A team for its tour of Australia in July 2013.

In November 2014, Robin was included into Indian One Day International squad for the last two matches against Sri Lanka.

Robin was included in 30 men Indian squad for 2015 Cricket World Cup.
Robin Uthappa was also included in team India which toured Zimbabwe in 2015

In June 2019, Uthappa moved from Saurashtra, joining Kerala, ahead of the 2019–20 Ranji Trophy season.

Indian Premier League 
Uthappa played for the Mumbai Indians in the 2008 Indian Premier League and had a fairly successful opening season. In his first match he scored 48 runs from 38 balls against Royal Challengers Bangalore. In the next game, against Chennai Super Kings, he made 43 (36) including 6 fours and a six. Against Kolkata Knight Riders, he stitched an unbeaten 123-run partnership with Dwayne Bravo, where he scored a run-a-ball 37 to steer Mumbai to an easy win. Then he scored 34 off just 21 deliveries to lead Mumbai to an emphatic victory over the in-form Rajasthan Royals. However, a quickfire 23-ball 46 from Uthappa went in vain after Delhi Daredevils clinched a 5-wicket win in a nail-biting finish.

In January 2009, he was swapped with Zaheer Khan and moved to Royal Challengers Bangalore. He had a disappointing 2009 season of IPL for the Royal Challengers. His only noteworthy innings came against the Mumbai Indians in a match where he struck 66* off 42 balls to guide the RCB run-chase.

In a match against Kings XI Punjab in 2010 Indian Premier League he smashed a 21-ball 51, the second fastest fifty in Indian Premier League and was instrumental in setting up the win for the Royal Challengers. He came up with another match-winning innings, against Chennai Super Kings, as he struck an unbeaten 68 off just 38 balls. He also won the Man of the match award for this effort. Against Kolkata Knight Riders, he scored an unbeaten 50 from only 22 deliveries to take the Challengers to another comfortable win. He ended the season with 374 runs from 14 innings at an average of 31.16. He also hit 27 sixes, which was the most by any batsman in that season. For his performances in 2010, he was named in the Cricinfo IPL XI.

For the 2011 Indian Premier League, he was bought by Pune Warriors for a huge sum of US$2.1 million (approximately INR 9.4 crores) in the auction held at Bangalore. He was the second most expensive player in that auction behind Gautam Gambhir, who was bought for US$2.4 million by Kolkata Knight Riders.

According to Bangalore Mirror, a few days before the start of the Champions League T20 Robin Uthappa converted to Roman Catholicism at the Holy Ghost Church in Bangalore. Bernard Moras, the Archbishop of Bangalore presided over and conducted the ceremony.

Even though IPL 5 was a disappointing one for Pune Warriors India, Robin Uthappa remained their top scorer scoring 405 runs from 16 games, which included a blistering 69 against the RCB. The same happened in Season 6 of IPL, although team's performance was poor, Robin Uthappa managed to score 434 runs in 16 matches.

For the seventh season of IPL, he was drafted in by Kolkata Knight Riders. He failed to perform well in first leg of the tournament conducted in UAE. He was then promoted to the opening position with Gautam Gambhir and performed well in the India-leg of the season. He won the Orange Cap, given for scoring most runs in the season, 660, and in the process created a T20 record for having scored 40+ scores in 8 consecutive games. He eventually made 11, breaking the record held by Mathew Hayden of most 40+ scores in a single season. He was part of the Knight Riders squad until being released ahead of the 2020 IPL auction.

He played 12 matches in the season, scoring 196 runs at an average of 16.33 and a highest-score of 41.

In January 2021, he was traded to Chennai Super Kings ahead of the 2021 Indian Premier League. He scored 63 runs from 44 balls in the Qualifier 1 against Delhi Capitals which helped Super kings to march towards the 9th IPL finals.

In the 2022 IPL Auction, Uthappa was bought by the Chennai Super Kings for his base price of ₹ 2 crores until being released ahead of the 2023 Indian Premier League.

Personal life 
Robin Uthappa is half Kodava by ethnicity. His mother Roselyn is a Malayali. His father, Venu Uthappa, a former hockey umpire is a Kodava Hindu. Later on in life he converted to Christianity which he practices. He married his long-time girlfriend Sheethal Goutham in March 2016.

Uthappa after a series of bad season in domestic cricket and failing to make it to the national squad was combating with depression and was on the verge of committing a suicide. He said that he once saw his success in failure of teammate. However, he rebuilt his career by changing his cricketing technique at a juncture when many of his peers who debuted after him were cementing their places in the National Squad. With a new batting technique, improve fitness with sheer hard work and dedication the hard-fought battle with depression was won and was back on field with spectacular performances.

References

External links 

 
 Robin Uthappa's profile page on Wisden
 
Unlucky Cricketer on Cricket and Cricketer

1985 births
Living people
India One Day International cricketers
India Twenty20 International cricketers
Kolkata Knight Riders cricketers
Cricketers at the 2007 Cricket World Cup
Karnataka cricketers
South Zone cricketers
Mumbai Indians cricketers
Royal Challengers Bangalore cricketers
Pune Warriors India cricketers
India Red cricketers
India Blue cricketers
India Green cricketers
Kodava people
People from Kodagu district
Cricketers from Karnataka
Recipients of the Rajyotsava Award 2006
Wicket-keepers
Chennai Super Kings cricketers